Gadget: Invention, Travel, & Adventure (or Gadget: Past as Future) is an adventure game designed by Haruhiko Shono and first released by Synergy Interactive in 1993, following his earlier works Alice: An Interactive Museum (1991) and L-Zone (1992). Like Shono's earlier titles, Gadget uses pre-rendered 3D computer graphics  and resembles a point-and-click adventure game similar to Myst (1993), but with a strictly linear storyline culminating in a fixed finale. It thus sometimes tends to be classified more as an interactive movie rather than a video game. The story centers around a future dominated by retro technology from the 1920s and 1930s, especially streamlined locomotives and flying machines.

Plot

The game's plot takes place in an unspecified (albeit vaguely Eastern European) nation headed by the dictator Orlovsky. The protagonist is a government agent tasked with discovering the whereabouts of a missing scientist named Horselover Frost. He begins his quest in a third-floor room of a luxury hotel (which is in fact the headquarters of the government's intelligence arm). After collecting his belongings in a suitcase, the protagonist takes an elevator ride to the lobby, during which a boy replaces the case with another identical one containing various spy-related paraphernalia. In the lobby, the government's intelligence chief briefs the protagonist on his mission. The protagonist then moves to the central railway station. From this point on all the events of the story take place on trains or at the various stations (which include the national science institute) along the nation's main rail line. The player must engage in scripted conversations with various individuals, each of whom reveals pieces of information that advance the protagonist in his quest.

Release 
The game was originally released on 1 CD in 1993 by Synergy Interactive, based in Tokyo, Japan. A special edition of the game, Gadget: Past as Future, was later released on four CDs in 1997 by Cryo Interactive for Windows, Macintosh, and the PlayStation home console. On March 23, 2011, a remastered version of Gadget: Past as Future was released for iOS by NTT Resonant Inc.

Reception
The game was reviewed in 1994 in Dragon #212 by Ken Rolston in the "Eye of the Monitor" column. Rolston gave the game a very positive review, stating "I'm a total fan of Gadget." In 1996, Billboard described the game as a sleeper success and noted that it had attracted a cult following in America, leading to the re-release of earlier Shono titles Alice: An Interactive Museum and L-Zone. Shono was heralded as a pioneer by America's Newsweek and Japan's Ministry of International Trade and Industry.

According to Mexican filmmaker Guillermo del Toro (director of Hellboy and Pan's Labyrinth), Gadget was "very influential on movies like Dark City and The Matrix." Del Toro mentioned Gadget as one of his favorite games, along with Cosmology of Kyoto, Asteroids and Galaga.

Related media
A tie-in novel titled The Third Force, subtitled A Novel of Gadget and written by Marc Laidlaw, was released in 1996. A companion volume of additional art and background plot material, Inside Out with Gadget, was also available, as well as a DVD entitled Gadget Trips/Mindscapes and an auxiliary CD-ROM containing videos, stills, previews and interactive 3D models under the title 'Preview and Reprise'.

References

External links
 Gadget: Invention, Travel & Adventure review at Adventure Classic Gaming
 
 Gadget: Past as Future iOS re-release 
 Prophet of the Digital Age, a CoreGamers Profile & Interview Article with Haruhiko Shono

1993 video games
Apple Bandai Pippin games
Cryo Interactive games
Dieselpunk video games
FM Towns games
Interactive movie video games
IOS games
Classic Mac OS games
PlayStation (console) games
Video games developed in Japan
Windows games
Single-player video games